Ian MacFarlane (26 January 1933, in Lanark – 17 June 2019) was a Scottish football player and manager.

MacFarlane played for Aberdeen, Chelsea and Leicester City as a full back.

MacFarlane managed Carlisle United from 1 January 1970 to 1 June 1972. Notable signings he made for Carlisle include John Gorman in September 1970 and Stanley Bowles in October 1971. He was caretaker manager of Sunderland from 18 October 1976 to 1 December 1976 for 7 games (2 wins, 1 draw, 4 losses. He was succeeded by Jimmy Adamson. He then managed Leicester City for 5 games in 1978 as caretaker manager, losing 4 and winning once. As an assistant manager, he won the Football League Cup with Manchester City.

He died on 17 June 2019, aged 86.

References

External links

1933 births
2019 deaths
Association football fullbacks
Scottish footballers
Aberdeen F.C. players
Chelsea F.C. players
Leicester City F.C. players
Leicester City F.C. non-playing staff
Manchester City F.C. non-playing staff
Scottish Football League players
English Football League players
Scottish football managers
Carlisle United F.C. managers
Leicester City F.C. managers
Yeovil Town F.C. managers
English Football League managers
Bath City F.C. players
Sportspeople from Lanark
Footballers from South Lanarkshire